The Guayama Metropolitan Statistical Area is a United States Census Bureau defined Metropolitan Statistical Area (MSA) in southeastern Puerto Rico. 2020 Census results placed the population at 68,442, an 18.73% decrease over the 2010 Census. 2010 Census results placed the population at 84,214, a 0.83% increase over the 2000 census figure of 83,570.

Municipalities
A total of three municipalities (Spanish: municipios) are included as part of the Guayama Metropolitan Statistical Area.

Guayama (Principal city) Pop: 36,614
Patillas Pop: 15,985
Arroyo Pop: 15,843

See also
Puerto Rico census statistical areas

References